Jens-Peter Rossen Bonde (27 March 1948 – 4 April 2021) was a Danish politician who served as Member of the European Parliament (MEP) with the June Movement. He resigned as an MEP in May 2008. Bonde was elected to the European Parliament in the first election in 1979 with the People's Movement against the EU. He was re-elected 6 times consecutively. In 1992 he co-founded the June Movement which he chaired until his retirement in May 2008.

Jens-Peter Bonde emerged from the Danish Left of the 1970s, however he was on the centre-left for much of his life. In November 2005 he was the inspiration behind the setting up of a new Party at a European level, EUDemocrats. He was its president from 2005 to 2009.

Bonde wrote over 60 books on the EU, including editions of EU treaties with additional commentary.

Family
Jens-Peter Bonde is the son of Nina Bonde and Nis Bonde. He was married to Lisbeth Kirk, editor-in-chief of the independent online newspaper EUobserver. Jens-Peter has four sons and two grandchildren.

Retirement
On 25 March 2008, Bonde announced his retirement from the European Parliament. Bonde intended to spend more time encouraging the growth of parties similar to the June Movement in the rest of Europe and building the EUDemocrats. He was also working for referendums on the Treaty of Lisbon. Bonde resigned his seat on 9 May 2008 and was replaced by Hanne Dahl, who was second on the June Movement's list of candidates in the 2004 election.
In January 2009 Bonde resigned as President of the EUDemocrats and was succeeded by Sören Wibe.

Education
 1966: Advanced school-leaving certificate
 1966–1974: Studied political science at the Aarhus University

Career
 1963–1973: Member Danish Social Liberal Party's Youth 
 1974–1979: Editor, Notat
 1975–1992: Member of the Danish Communist Party
 1972: Co-founder of the People's Movement against the EU
 1991: Co-founder of Denmark 92
 1992: Co-founder, and spokesperson (1992–2008) of the June Movement
 1979–2008: Member of the European Parliament
 1992–1994: Chairman of the Delegation for relations with Iceland
 1994–1995 Member of the Tindemans group
 Co-Chairman (1994–1997) and Chairman (1997–1999) of the Europe of Nations Group
 1999–2004: Chairman of the Group for a Europe of Democracies and Diversities
 Chairman of the Independence/Democracy Group
 Co-founder of the Intergroup SOS Democracy
 Co-founder of the Intergroup Eurosun
 1992: Co-founder of TEAM
 2004: Co-founder of Friends of Clean Accounts, The Referendum Group
 2005: Co-founder of EUDemocrats – Alliance for a Europe of Democracies, a European political party
 2007: Co-founder of Foundation for EU Democracy, a Political foundation at European level
 2009: Advisor to Declan Ganley for the European Election 2009

See also
 2004 European Parliament election in Denmark

References

External links
  
 en.euabc.com
 
 
 Independence/Democracy group in the European parliament
 EUDemocrats – Alliance for a Europe of Democracies
 Reddit AMA with Jens-Peter Bonde dated 14/09/2014

1948 births
2021 deaths
People from Aabenraa Municipality
Libertas.eu
Euroscepticism in Denmark
Aarhus University alumni
June Movement MEPs
People's Movement against the EU MEPs
MEPs for Denmark 1979–1984
MEPs for Denmark 1984–1989
MEPs for Denmark 1989–1994
MEPs for Denmark 1994–1999
MEPs for Denmark 1999–2004
MEPs for Denmark 2004–2009